The 1986 Virginia Slims of New Orleans was a women's tennis tournament played on indoor carpet courts in New Orleans, Louisiana in the United States that was part of the 1986 Virginia Slims World Championship Series. It was the third edition of the tournament and was held from September 29 through October 5, 1986. First-seeded Martina Navratilova won the singles title, her second at the event after 1984, and earned $30,000 first-prize money.

Finals

Singles
 Martina Navratilova defeated  Pam Shriver 6–1, 4–6, 6–2
 It was Navratilova's 10th singles title of the year and the 121st of her career.

Doubles
 Candy Reynolds /  Anne Smith defeated  Svetlana Parkhomenko /  Larisa Savchenko 6–3, 3–6, 6–3

References

External links
 ITF tournament edition details

Virginia Slims of New Orleans
Virginia Slims of New Orleans
1986 in Louisiana
1986 in American tennis